Blaenavon railway station  may refer to:
 Blaenavon High Level railway station, now on the preserved Pontypool and Blaenavon Railway

 Blaenavon Low Level railway station, now closed